Lac de l'Abbaye is a lake at Grande-Rivière, in the Jura department of France.

The lake is also known as Lac de Grandvaux or Lac de la Grande Rivière.

Abbaye